Melanie Matchett Wood (born 1981) is an American mathematician at Harvard University who was the first woman to qualify for the U.S. International Mathematical Olympiad Team. She completed her PhD in 2009 at Princeton University (under Manjul Bhargava) and is currently Professor of Mathematics at Harvard University, after being Chancellor's Professor of Mathematics at UC Berkeley and Vilas Distinguished Achievement Professor of Mathematics at the University of Wisconsin, and spending 2 years as Szegö Assistant Professor at Stanford University.  

She is a number theorist; more specifically, her research centers on arithmetic statistics, with excursions into related questions in arithmetic geometry and probability theory.

Wood was born in Indianapolis, Indiana, to Sherry Eggers and Archie Wood, both middle school teachers. Her father, a mathematics teacher, died of cancer when Wood was six weeks old.

While a high school student at Park Tudor School in Indianapolis, Wood (then aged 16) became the first, and until 2004 the only female American to make the U.S. International Mathematical Olympiad Team, receiving silver medals in the 1998 and 1999 International Mathematical Olympiad. Wood was also a cheerleader and student newspaper editor at her school.

In 2002, she received the Alice T. Schafer Prize from the Association for Women in Mathematics.

In 2003, Wood graduated from Duke University where she won a Gates Cambridge Scholarship, Fulbright fellowship, and a National Science Foundation graduate fellowship, in addition to becoming the first American woman and second woman overall to be named a Putnam Fellow in 2002. 

During the 2003–2004 year she studied at Cambridge University. She was also named the Deputy Leader of the U.S. team that finished second overall at the 2005 International Mathematical Olympiad.

In 2004, she won the Morgan Prize for work in two topics, Belyi-extending maps and P-orderings, making her the first woman to win this award.

In 2012, she became a fellow of the American Mathematical Society.

In 2017, she received an NSF CAREER Award.

In 2018, she received the AWM-Microsoft Research Prize in Algebra and Number Theory from the Association for Women in Mathematics.

In 2021, she received the NSF Alan T. Waterman Award.

In 2022, she was awarded a MacArthur Fellowship.

Selected publications
Wood, Melanie (2019). "Nonabelian Cohen-Lenstra moments. With an appendix by the author and Philip Matchett Wood". Duke Math. J. 168, no. 3, 377–427. MR 3909900.
Vakil, Ravi; Wood, Melanie (2015). "Discriminants in the Grothendieck ring". Duke Math. J. 164, no. 6, 1139–1185. MR 3336842.

Wood, Melanie (2010). "On the probabilities of local behaviors in abelian field extensions". Compos. Math. 146, no. 1, 102–128. MR 2581243

References

External links
 An Interview with Melanie Matchett Wood (The Girls' Angle Bulletin)
 A Conversation with Melanie Wood (Math Horizons magazine)
 The Girl Who Loved Math (Discover magazine)
 Melanie Wood: The Making of a Mathematician (Duke University profile)
 Melanie Wood (homepage at the University of California, Berkeley)

 

1981 births
Living people
People from Indianapolis
Duke University alumni
Princeton University alumni
Putnam Fellows
21st-century American mathematicians
Number theorists
Stanford University Department of Mathematics faculty
Fellows of the American Mathematical Society
International Mathematical Olympiad participants
21st-century women mathematicians
Park Tudor School alumni
Date of birth missing (living people)